William Mure, of Caldwell (9 May 1830 – 9 November 1880) was a British soldier and Liberal Party politician.

Early life
He was the son of Laura Markham and William Mure (1799–1860), also a former MP for Renfrewshire. Mure was the nephew of David Mure.  His mother was the second daughter of William Markham of Becca Hall, Yorkshire, and the granddaughter of William Markham (1719–1807) the Archbishop of York from 1776 to 1807.

His sister, Emma Mure (1833–1911), who married Thomas Lister, 3rd Baron Ribblesdale (1828–1876), was the mother of Thomas Lister, 4th Baron Ribblesdale, whose second marriage was to the American heiress, Ava Lowle Willing (1868–1958), former wife of John Jacob Astor IV.

Career
He reached the rank of Lieutenant-Colonel in the Scots Fusilier Guards.

He was elected at the 1874 general election as the Member of Parliament (MP) for Renfrewshire, and was re-elected at the 1880 general election. He died later that year, aged 50.

Personal life
In 1859, he married Constance Elizabeth Wyndham (d. 1920), daughter of George Wyndham, 1st Baron Leconfield and Mary Fanny Blunt, and sister of Henry Wyndham, 2nd Baron Leconfield. Her maternal grandfather was the Reverend William Blunt and her paternal grandfather was George O'Brien Wyndham, 3rd Earl of Egremont. Together they had:

 Lt.-Col. William Mure of Caldwell (d. 1912), who married Lady Georgiana Theresa Montgomerie (d. 1938), daughter of George Montgomerie, 15th Earl of Eglinton, in 1895.
 Constance Madeline Emma Mure (d. 1961), who married Edward Lawrence Peel (1860–1936), the son of Sir Charles Lennox Peel, in 1905.
 Marjorie Caroline Susan Mure (d. 1961), who married John Michael Gordon Biddulph, 2nd Baron Biddulph (1869–1949), in 1896.
 Mary Laura Florence Mure (d. 1932), who married Sir Spencer John Portal, 4th Bt. (1864–1955), in 1890.

Mure died on 9 November 1880.

References

External links 
 

1830 births
1880 deaths
Scottish Liberal Party MPs
Members of the Parliament of the United Kingdom for Scottish constituencies
UK MPs 1874–1880
UK MPs 1880–1885
Scots Guards officers